Goodwill Theatre is a historic movie theater located at Johnson City in Broome County, New York. It is a three-story steel frame building on a concrete foundation built in 1920.  Its exterior is faced with red brick, cut limestone and marble in the Neoclassical style.  It was a gift to the people of Johnson City by George F. Johnson (1857–1948), founder of Endicott-Johnson Shoe Company.

It was listed on the National Register of Historic Places in 2000.

The theatre is currently a performing arts theatre.

Staff 

 Naima Kradjian - Chief Executive Officer 
 Christine Springer - General Manager 
 Kellie Powell - Marketing Manager
 Lynn Carl Bond - Bookkeeper 
 K Morgan Prikazsky - Box Office Manager
 Joe Roma - - Building Superintendent
 Julia Rakus - Box Office Assistant
 Steven Foltyn - Facilities Assistant

References

External links
Goodwill Theatre website
Staff

Cinemas and movie theaters in New York (state)
Theatres completed in 1920
History of Broome County, New York
National Register of Historic Places in Broome County, New York
Buildings and structures in Broome County, New York
Tourist attractions in Broome County, New York
Theatres on the National Register of Historic Places in New York (state)
1920 establishments in New York (state)